Sylvester Wright (born December 30, 1971) is a former American football defensive end and linebacker. He played for the Philadelphia Eagles from 1995 to 1996.

References

1971 births
Living people
American football defensive ends
American football linebackers
Kansas Jayhawks football players
Philadelphia Eagles players
Frankfurt Galaxy players